High School Affiliated to Nanjing Normal University (or NSFZ/南師附中 for short) is a high school located in Nanjing, China. It was founded in 1902, and was known as High School Affiliated to National Central University (國立中央大學附屬中學) before 1949, and High School Affiliated to Nanjing University (南京大學附屬中學) during a short period later, until 1952.

The school boasts two campuses. At its main campus, it has hosted the Nanjing campus of Caulfield Grammar School, an independent Australian school, which has run an internationalism program in China since 1998. Students from Caulfield live on the campus for five week programs, and during this time they participate in two day homestay visits with students from the High School Affiliated to Nanjing Normal University.

In 2007, the High School Affiliated to Nanjing Normal University joined in a sister school partnership with Charlotte Country Day School in Charlotte, North Carolina, USA.  Since 2007, the two schools have organized annual teacher exchanges and student visits.  

High School Affiliated to Nanjing Normal University is nationally and regionally recognized and received titles and awards such as National Model High School, Basic Education Reform Experiment School (Ministry of Education), Top Ten Schools of Basic Education in China, Key Middle School of Jiangsu, Model School of Jiangsu, and Top Four Schools of Jiangsu Province. The school is also a member of International School Connection. In 2007, the school became a member of International Baccalaureate and now offers IB Diploma Programme taught in English. In a 2016 ranking of Chinese high schools that send students to study in American universities, it ranked number 22 in mainland China in terms of the number of students entering top American universities.

The school sets up several international exchange programs cooperated with Caulfield High School in Australia. Students from the two countries live together and have both Chinese and English Classes. The program not only provide students with an international studying environment, but also promote the relationship the two countries.

Notable educators

 Liu Yizheng(柳詒徵) - historian
 Hu Xiansu(胡先驌)- botanist
 Chang Chi-yun(張其昀) - historian, founder of the Chinese Culture University and the Nanhai Academy, former Minister of Education of Republic of China
 Hu Huanyong(胡煥庸) - demographer, founder of China's population geography
 Luo Jialun(羅家倫) - historian, former president of National Central University (Nanjing University) and Tsinghua University

Notable alumni

Politics
 Kwoh-Ting Li(李國鼎) - economist, former Finance Minister of Republic of China,a founder of Hsinchu Science Park. He was known as the Father of Taiwan's Economic Miracle
 Wang Daohan(汪道涵) - former mayor of Shanghai, first president of the Association for Relations Across the Taiwan Straits

Academia
 Qu Bochuan(屈伯川) - chemist, founder of the Dalian University of Technology
 Wang Hao(王浩) - logician, philosopher and mathematician.
 Yuan Longping(袁隆平) - fellow of the Chinese Academy of Sciences and the Chinese Academy of Engineering.
 Wang Gungwu(王賡武) - historian, Academician at Academia Sinica, former president of University of Hong Kong

Culture
 Ba Jin(巴金) - writer, author of The Family
 Yu Chi-chung(余紀忠), founder of China Times

Military
Sun Yuanliang(孫元良) - former general of the National Revolutionary Army

References

Related links
 Official site 
 High School Affiliated to Nanjing Normal University Jiangning Campus
 High School Affiliated to Nanjing Normal University Alumni Group on Linkedin

High schools in Nanjing
Nanjing University
Educational institutions established in 1902
Nanjing Normal University
International Baccalaureate schools in China
1902 establishments in China